Wax is a surname. Notable people with the name include:

Amy Wax (born 1953), American law professor
Carol Wax (born 1953), American artist and author
Chaim Elozor Wax (1822—89), Polish Hasidic rabbi and scholar
David Wax, American kidnapper
Jimmy Wax (born 1912), American rabbi
Mikey Wax, American pianist, guitarist and singer-songwriter
Ruby Wax (born 1953), American-born British comedian
Steven T. Wax (born 1949), American lawyer

See also
Wachs